Two referendums were held in Switzerland in 1887. The first was held on 15 May, asking voters whether they approved of a federal law on spirits, and was approved by 65.9% of voters. The second was held on 10 July, asking voters whether they approved of an amendment made to article 64 of the federal constitution, and was approved by 77.9% of voters and 20.5 cantons.

Background
The spirits referendum was an optional referendum, which meant that only a majority of the public vote was required for the proposal to be approved. The constitutional referendum was a mandatory referendum, which required both a majority of voters and cantons.

Results

Federal spirits law

Constitutional amendment

References

1887 referendums
1887 in Switzerland
Referendums in Switzerland